Celia Elizabeth Green (born 26 November 1935) is a British writer on philosophical skepticism and psychology.

Biography 

Green's parents were both primary school teachers, who together authored a series of geography textbooks which became known as The Green Geographies.

She was educated first at the Ursuline Convent in Ilford, and later at the Woodford High School for Girls, a state school. In a book, Letters from Exile, she compared these two schools and made conclusions that preferred parentally financed to state education. She won the Senior Open Scholarship to Somerville College, Oxford aged 17.

In 1960 she was awarded a B.Litt. degree from Oxford University's faculty of Literae Humaniores (Philosophy), for a thesis, supervised by H. H. Price, entitled An Enquiry into Some States of Consciousness and their Physiological Foundation. From 1957 to 1960, Green held the post of Research Officer at the Society for Psychical Research in London. 

In 1961, Green founded and became the Director of the Institute of Psychophysical Research. The Institute's areas of interest were initially listed as philosophy, psychology, theoretical physics, and ESP. However, its principal work during the sixties and seventies concerned hallucinations and other quasi-perceptual experiences in normal subjects. Its main benefactor, from 1963 to 1970, was Cecil Harmsworth King, then Chairman of the IPC group, which owned the Daily Mirror.

In 1996 Green was awarded a DPhil degree by the Oxford faculty of Literae Humaniores for a thesis on causation and the mind-body problem.  Green is an Honorary Research Fellow at the Department of Philosophy, University of Liverpool.

Work 
Green's basic philosophical position is radical scepticism, based on a perception of what she calls 'the total uncertainty'. This perception leads her to agnostic positions, not just on traditional philosophical issues such as the nature of physical causation, but also on current social arrangements, such as state education and the monopolistic power of the medical profession.<ref>Green, C., Letters from Exile, Observations on a Culture in Decline. Oxford: Oxford Forum, 2004, passim.</ref> 

There are also strong hereditarian and anti-feminist elements in her thinking. 

Green has interest in the concepts of royalty and aristocracy. Green developed a concept of 'centralisation', which is far removed from the 'Californian' concept of 'centredness', and has more to do with a heroic reaction to the perception that the human condition is intolerable, and that single-mindedness and urgency are the only appropriate responses. 

Green endorses libertarianism. A pamphlet written by Green on education was published in the 1990s by the Libertarian Alliance.

Green's philosophical book The Human Evasion has been translated into Dutch, German, Italian, and Russian. It is a critical analysis of twentieth century thinkers, from Wittgenstein to Tillich.

 Ethics 
Green proposed a distinction between tribal and territorial morality. Tribal morality is prescriptive, contingent, culturally determined, and 'flexible', imposing the norms of a group on the individual. Whereas territorial morality attempts to set up rigid, universal, abstract principles (such as Kant's categorical imperative). Green links the rise of territorial morality to the development of the concept of private property, and eventually of market capitalism, including the primacy of contract over status. 

 Empirical research 
Green's empirical work, some of it undertaken in collaboration with an Oxford psychologist, Charles McCreery, has focussed mainly on hallucinatory experiences in ostensibly normal people.

In 1968 Green published Lucid Dreams, a study of dreams in which the subject is aware that he or she is asleep and dreaming. The possibility of conscious insight during dreams had previously been treated with scepticism by some philosophers and psychologists.  However, Green collated both previously published first-hand accounts and the results of longitudinal studies of four subjects of her own. She predicted that lucid dreams would be found to be correlated with the rapid eye movement (REM) stage of sleep, a prediction which was subsequently confirmed by experiment.Ogilvie, R., Hunt, H., Kushniruk, A. & Newman, J. (1983): 'Lucid dreams and the arousal continuum.' Sleep Research, 12, 182.

In 1968 Green published an analysis of 400 first-hand accounts of out-of-body experiences. In 1975 Green and McCreery published a similar taxonomy of 'apparitions', or hallucinations in which the viewpoint of the subject was not ostensibly displaced, based on a collection of 1500 first-hand accounts.

Green has put forward the idea that lucid dreams, out-of-body experiences and apparitional experiences have something in common, namely that in all three types of case the subject's field of perception is entirely replaced by a hallucinatory one. In the first two types of case she considers this self-evident from the nature of the experience, but in the case of apparitional experiences in the waking state the idea is far from obvious. The hypothesis, and the evidence and arguments for it, were first put forward in her book Apparitions, and later developed in her book Lucid Dreaming, the Paradox of Consciousness during Sleep, both of which she co-authored with McCreery.

 Aphorisms 
Her aphorisms have been published in The Decline and Fall of Science and Advice to Clever Children. Ten are included in the Penguin Dictionary of Epigrams, and three in the Penguin Dictionary of Modern Quotations.

 Bibliography 

Books

 Lucid Dreams (1968) London: Hamish Hamilton. Reissued 1977, Oxford : Institute of Psychophysical Research . 
 Out-of-the-body Experiences (1968) London: Hamish Hamilton. Reissued 1977, Oxford : Institute of Psychophysical Research. 
 The Human Evasion (1969)  London: Hamish Hamilton. Reissued 1977, Oxford: Institute of Psychophysical Research . 
 The Decline and Fall of Science (1976) London: Hamish Hamilton. Reissued 1977, Oxford: Institute of Psychophysical Research . 
 Advice to Clever Children (1981) Oxford : Institute of Psychophysical Research.
 The Lost Cause: Causation and the Mind-Body Problem (2003) Oxford: Oxford Forum.
 Letters from Exile: Observations on a Culture in Decline (2004) Oxford: Oxford Forum.
 The Corpse and the Kingdom (2023) Oxford: Oxford Forum.

with Charles McCreery:

 Apparitions (1975) London: Hamish Hamilton.
 Lucid Dreaming: The Paradox of Consciousness During Sleep (1994) London: Routledge.

Selected papers

 'Waking dreams and other metachoric experiences', Psychiatric Journal of the University of Ottawa, 15, 1990, pp. 123–128.
 'Are mental events preceded by their physical causes?' (with Grant Gillett), Philosophical Psychology, 8, 1995, pp. 333–340.
 'Freedom and the exceptional child', Educational Notes, No. 26, Libertarian Alliance, 1993. Available as an Online PDF
 'Hindrances to the progress of medical and scientific research', in Medical Science and the Advancement of World Health, ed. R. Lanza, Praeger, New York, 1985.

Translations

René Sudre. Traité de Parapsychologie, published as Treatise on Parapsychology (1960)

 CDs 

In 1995 the CD titled Lucid Dreams 0096, narrated by Green for the label Em:t was released. Earlier Green had contributed a nine-minute track to a compilation CD put out by the same recording label.   The track was entitled 'In the Extreme' and consisted of readings by the author from her books, The Human Evasion, and Advice to Clever Children''.

References and notes

See also 
 Oxford Forum

External links 

 Green's web site
 The Human Evasion online

1935 births
Living people
20th-century British philosophers
21st-century British philosophers
British women philosophers
Parapsychologists
Philosophers of mind
Alumni of Somerville College, Oxford